Edmund Severn (December 10, 1862 – May 14, 1942) was an American composer and violinist.  Born in England, in Nottingham, he moved to the United States at four, settling in Hartford, Connecticut and studying violin with his father; he later studied music in Berlin. There he studied the Joachim bowing technique.  As a composer he wrote mainly orchestral music, as well as many pieces for his instrument, including a concerto; he also wrote three string quartets.  He died in Melrose, Massachusetts. His most famous work is his "Polish Dance" for violin and piano, composed in 1918.

Edmund Severn's work is often reflective of folk, nationalist and neoclassical genres of music. Severn continued composing into the mid-20th century until he died in 1942.

Severn's pupils included the composer Frances Terry.

References

External links

1862 births
1942 deaths
American male composers
American composers
English composers
English emigrants to the United States
American expatriates in Germany